Lipoatrophia annularis  is a skin condition affecting primarily women, characterized by the loss of subcutaneous fat in the upper extremity.

It is a form of lipodystrophy.

See also 
 Lipoatrophia semicircularis
 List of cutaneous conditions

References 

Conditions of the subcutaneous fat